Prince Raj (born 7 July 1989) is an Indian politician. He was elected as Member of Parliament, Lok Sabha from Samastipur in a by-poll on 24 October 2019, after the death of his father and sitting MP Ram Chandra Paswan. Prince Raj was appointed president of Bihar unit of Lok Janshakti Party in October 2019, replacing his uncle Pashupati Kumar Paras.

He became the member of Committee on Welfare of Scheduled Castes and Scheduled Tribes as well as Consultative Committee, Ministry of Youth Affairs and Sports.

On 15 June 2021, Chirag Paswan suspended 5 rebel MP's along with Prince for anti-party activities.

References

|-

Lok Janshakti Party politicians
1989 births
Living people
India MPs 2019–present
People from Khagaria district